
Gmina Dąbrowa is a rural gmina (administrative district) in Mogilno County, Kuyavian-Pomeranian Voivodeship, in north-central Poland.

Villages
Gmina Dąbrowa contains the villages and settlements of Białe Błota, Dąbrowa, Krzekotowo, Mierucin, Mierucinek, Mokre, Parlin, Parlinek, Sędowo, Słaboszewko, Słaboszewo, Sucharzewo, Szczepankowo and Szczepanowo.

Neighbouring gminas
Gmina Dąbrowa is bordered by the gminas of Barcin, Gąsawa, Janikowo, Mogilno, Pakość and Żnin.

References
Polish official population figures 2006

Dabrowa
Mogilno County